Dick's Knob or Dicks Knob, with an elevation of , is the third-highest peak in the State of Georgia if using a 200 ft. (61 m) prominence rule. It is located in Rabun County, Georgia within the Southern Nantahala Wilderness and is the second-highest mountain in the county.

Mountain
Dick's Knob is located in the Southern Nantahala Wilderness in the Chattahoochee National Forest on Pot Gap Ridge near the North Carolina border. Nearby geographical features include the Tallulah River, Standing Indian Mountain and Grassy Ridge. Dicks Knob is part of the southern Crystalline Appalachians. A dwarfed oak forest covers the mountain's summit.

The summit of Dick's Knob was burned during the 2016 Rock Mountain Fire.

Hiking
No trails pass over Dick's Knob's summit. However, the mountain can be reached by hiking off-trail south from the Appalachian Trail at Beech Gap or east from the Tate Branch Campground near Tate City.

See also
List of mountains in Georgia (U.S. state)

References 

Georgia's Named Summits
100 highest peaks in Georgia
Georgia peaks over 4,000 feet

External links 
TopoQuest map of Dick's Knob

Mountains of Georgia (U.S. state)
Mountains of Rabun County, Georgia
Chattahoochee-Oconee National Forest